Sir Charles Tupper Secondary School is a public secondary school located in Vancouver, British Columbia, Canada.

History
Opened in 1959, the school is named in honour of Sir Charles Tupper, Canada's 6th Prime Minister. Originally serving only grades 7, 8 and 9, the school grew to include grades 10, 11 and 12 by 1965. 

On November 28th, 2003, a 17 year-old student was beaten to death on the school grounds.  A former student was later convicted and sentenced to 7 years in prison for his role in the attack. In the years since the killing the culture of the school has changed dramatically, with students and staff embracing a new school code of conduct which advocates respect, ownership, attitude, responsibility, and safety. 

Today Tupper serves grades 8 through 12. 
On September 29, 2009, the school celebrated its 50th Anniversary, with hosts Friends of Tupper Fund

Programs Offered

Mini School
Established in 2000, Tupper's Mini School Program seeks academically motivated students looking for a challenge in the learning environment. Mini students attend enriched academic courses, however classes such as Physical Education and various electives are spent with the main school body.

Tupper Tech
Tupper Tech provides career focused grade 12 students the opportunity to gain experience in the trades, while working towards a full time apprenticeship. Working on a Day 1 / Day 2 rotation, students rotate each day between "hands on" education and academic classes. Many students are cross enrolled within other schools in the district, spending one day at Tupper, while returning to their home school for academic classes.

Athletics
Sir Charles Tupper Secondary School is known for its outstanding athletic achievements. In 2009-2010, the school's Wrestling, Bantam Boys Basketball, Bantam Boys Volleyball team, and most notably the Senior Boys Basketball (who ended Kitsilano Secondary school's 8 year streak) were Vancouver City Champions for the VSSAA (Vancouver Secondary Schools' Athletic Association) League. There have been many notable accomplishments at the provincial level, as well as various past successes in sports over the years.

The school offers a wide variety of sports throughout the school year, including volleyball, rugby, cross country, and badminton in the fall, basketball and wrestling in the winter, and rugby, soccer, volleyball, softball, tennis, track and field, and ultimate frisbee in the spring/summer season.

Timetable 

 Tupper operates on a semester system, with four classes from September to late January and four classes from February to late June. Each day consists of four blocks, with classes beginning at 8:40 a.m. and ending at 3:06 p.m.

Notable alumni
Harjit Sajjan - Canadian Minister of National Defence (2015 - 2021)
Derek Corrigan - Mayor of the City of Burnaby (2002 - 2018)
Jim Chu - Chief Constable of the Vancouver Police Department (2007 - 2015)
Mi-Jung Lee - Korean Canadian television personality, currently an anchor and producer at CTV British Columbia
Dave McKay - Major League Baseball player (1975 - 1982)
DJ Kemo, Juno-award winning DJ/ Producer
Bindy Johal - Gangster
Nathan Shaw aka Ekali (DJ) - Electronic music producer (2017 - Present), formerly a member of Said the Whale, a Juno Award-winning Vancouver based indie rock band (2011 - 2016)

References

External links
Sir Charles Tupper Secondary School's Website
Vancouver School Board - Sir Charles Tupper Secondary School

High schools in Vancouver
Educational institutions established in 1959
1959 establishments in British Columbia